Bray Studios is a British film and television facility in Water Oakley near Bray, Berkshire. It is best known for its association with Hammer Film Productions.

History

Down Place 
Down Place, a large Thamesside house in the Berkshire hamlet of Water Oakley, was built in the 1750s for Richard Tonson, the Member of Parliament for Windsor and relative of publisher Jacob Tonson. After Tonson's death in 1772, the house was owned by the Dukes of Argyll and subsequently by John Barker Church. A later owner, Mr Hudleston, sold the property to Henry Harford in around 1807. The Harford family continued to occupy the house at the time of the 1901 census. At some point after this, the house was vacated except for the west wing where the Davies family resided. Subsequently, the main building largely fell into dereliction.

Hammer Film Productions (1951–1970) 
In 1951, Hammer Film Productions bought Down Place, a location they had used in 1950 to film The Dark Light. The premises were largely derelict, and Hammer used the building's interior for filming before constructing a sound stage on the estate in 1952. The first full production at the studios was the 1951 film Cloudburst.

In 1959, Columbia Pictures bought a 49% share in the studios worth £300,000 (£ in 2019); the agreement saw a co-production deal whereby Columbia would produce five films a year at the studios. As this five-year agreement ended, Hammer founder James Carreras sold shares in the company to Associated British Picture Corporation (ABPC). This deal, made in 1963, saw Hammer obligated to move their production to Elstree Studios. Other facilities included a stills department, dressing rooms, set design and construction departments, production offices and administration departments. Audio recordings at Bray suffered as a result of the studios being within the flight path of Heathrow Airport.

The final Hammer film produced in full at Bray was 1966's The Mummy's Shroud; by November 1966 the move to Elstree was complete. In 1968, the last member of the Davies family left the house and the wing was converted into luxury flats. At the suggestion of EMI, as ABPC had become, Hammer sought to sell Bray Studios. Initially valued at £250,000 (£ in 2019), Hammer sold the site in November 1970 for approximately £70,000 (£ in 2019).

Post-Hammer era (1970–2014) 
Following their purchase, the premises were renamed the Bray International Film Centre and a fifth sound stage was constructed. Production continued at Bray, including special effects for series such as Doctor Who and Space 1999. In 1984, Redspring sold the complex to the Samuelson Group for £700,000 (£ in 2019). Samuelson provided the complex with a £2,000,000 (£ in 2019) investment before selling the site to a property development company who planned to demolish the sound stages and convert Down Place into office buildings. In 1991, television producer Neville Hendricks bought the complex and allowed film production to continue.
At this time, the soundstages at Bray were used as a rehearsal facility for large musical events and touring acts, including, Led Zeppelin in July 1979, in preparation for their two shows at the Knebworth Festival in August of 1979, the Freddie Mercury Tribute Concert and on numerous occasions by Pink Floyd and Roger Waters.

Sale (2014–2019) 
In 2014, Hendricks announce his intention to sell the site, explaining that it was not economically viable citing competition from the studios at Pinewood and Shepperton, as well as Bray's location in a green belt. He sold the complex to a property development company who submitted a planning application in 2015 for luxury apartments and demolition of the sound stage buildings; demolition of buildings at Bray began in 2017.

Reopening (2019–)
Filming resumed at Bray in 2019 with all three episodes of the BBC's Dracula having scenes filmed at the complex. In June 2020, Windsor and Maidenhead Borough Council approved plans to expand the complex with new studios and workshops.

List of productions

Footnotes

References

1951 establishments in England
British film studios
Companies based in Berkshire
Bray, Berkshire
British companies established in 1951
Hammer Film Productions